Atwater Elementary School District (AESD) is a school district in California. Its headquarters are in Atwater.

Schools
Middle
 Mitchell Senior Elementary School (grades 7–8)
 Bellevue Senior Elementary School (grades 7–8)
 Peggy Heller Senior Elementary School (grades 7–8)
Elementary
 Bellevue Elementary School
 Aileen Colburn Elementary School
 Peggy Heller Elementary School
 Mitchell K-6 Elementary School
 Thomas Olaeta Elementary School
 Shaffer Elementary School
 Elmer Wood Elementary School
Alternative
 Atwater Senior Academy (grades 6–8)

References

External links

School districts in Merced County, California